People in Need is a Czech humanitarian organization.

People in Need may also refer to:

 People in Need, RTE telethon, which created The People in Need Trust, a charity in Ireland
People in Need, charity created by the Hearst family in response to kidnapping; Sara Jane Moore
 People in Need (film), a 1925 German film

See also
Children in Need